The 1959 Formula One season was the 13th season of FIA Formula One motor racing. It featured the 1959 World Championship of Drivers and the 1959 International Cup for F1 Manufacturers, contested concurrently over a nine-race series  which commenced on 10 May and ended on 12 December. The season also included several non-championship Formula One races.

Jack Brabham won the World Championship of Drivers  in a sport still reeling from the death of several drivers, including reigning champion Mike Hawthorn. The International Cup for F1 Manufacturers was awarded to Cooper–Climax.

Season summary
Vanwall's withdrawal, believed to have been a result of the high mortality rate of the 1958 season, left Ferrari as the only race-winning team in the championship. Similarly, Juan Manuel Fangio and Mike Hawthorn's retirement meant that for the very first time, no world champion was on the grid. Cooper's revolutionary mid-engined cars, powered by the compact Coventry-Climax 2.5 litre engine, won five races with Jack Brabham, Stirling Moss and Bruce McLaren. BRM also landed its maiden victory in the hands of Jo Bonnier. Aston Martin appeared with a car that was outdated and overweight in the face of Cooper's rear mid-engined revolution.

The German Grand Prix was held for the second time on the very high speed AVUS circuit, where Ferrari's Jean Behra was killed during an unrelated sports car race at the wheel of a Porsche.

Ferrari's Tony Brooks took the fight to the Coopers, and going into the final race, he, Moss, or Brabham could win the title. Moss retired from the race, the inaugural United States Grand Prix, giving Brabham the lead. Brabham ran out of fuel on the last lap but pushed his car across the line to finish fourth. With Brooks unable to do better than third, Brabham became the first Australian World Champion, while Cooper won the constructors' crown.

Season review

There were three scheduled Grands Prix in 1959 that were cancelled:
The Argentine Grand Prix, scheduled to be held in January, was cancelled because with heroes such as Juan Manuel Fangio and José Froilán González having retired, there was no local interest, and the race was promptly cancelled. 
The Belgian Grand Prix was scheduled to be held in June, but it was cancelled due to a dispute over start money. 
The Moroccan Grand Prix was scheduled to be held in October at Ain-Diab, but it was cancelled for monetary reasons. 
The Indianapolis 500 also counted towards the 1959 USAC Championship, and was run for USAC Championship cars, but did not count towards the International Cup for F1 Manufacturers.

Teams and drivers
The following teams and drivers competed in the 1959 FIA World Championship.

World Drivers' Championship standings

Points were awarded on an 8–6–4–3–2 basis to the first five finishers at each Grand Prix, with an additional point going to the driver who set the fastest lap. Only the best five results contributed to the World Championship.

 Italics indicates the fastest lap (One point awarded – point shared equally between drivers sharing fastest lap)
 Bold indicates pole position

International Cup for F1 Manufacturers standings
Points were awarded on an 8–6–4–3–2 basis to the first five finishers at each round (excluding the Indianapolis 500). However, a manufacturer only received points for its highest-placed car in each round, and only the best five results from the eight races were retained.

Bold results counted to championship totals.

Non-championship races
Other Formula One races were also held in 1959, which did not count towards the World Championship.

Notes

References

Formula One seasons